Kalinowa - is a Polish coat of arms that was used by many noble families in medieval Poland and later under the Polish–Lithuanian Commonwealth.

Notable bearers
Notable bearers of this Coat of Arms include:
 Kalinowski family

See also
 Polish heraldry
 Heraldry
 Coat of Arms
 List of Polish nobility coats of arms

Bibliography

 Tadeusz Gajl: Herbarz polski od średniowiecza do XX wieku : ponad 4500 herbów szlacheckich 37 tysięcy nazwisk 55 tysięcy rodów. L&L, 2007. .

Polish coats of arms